deSoL is the first major album release by the Latin rock band, deSoL. This album was released twice, first in 2004 with a release party at the Mercury Lounge in New York City, and second in 2005 with a different track listing.

Track listing
"Chango" (Cabrera, Guerrero, Guice, Letke, J.C. Monterrosa, Dominick Prevete, Soto) – 3:31
"Blanco y Negro" (Guice, Letke, Monterrosa) – 3:54
"Chica de Miami" (Cabrera, Guerrero, Guice, Letke, J.C. Monterrosa, Soto) – 3:59
"White Dove (Paloma)" (Cabrera, Dave Greenberg, Guerrero, J.C. Monterrosa, Previte, Soto) – 4:18
"Spanish Radio" (Cabrera, Monterrosa) – 3:37
"Band Leader" (Guice, Letke, Monterrosa) – 3:55
"Spin Around" (Addeo, Guerrero, Monterrosa) – 3:43
"Karma" (Cabrera, Guerrero, Guice, Letke, J.C. Monterrosa, Prevete, Soto) – 4:02
"La Musica" (Guerrero, Guice, J.C. Monterrosa, Previte, Soto) – 3:19
"Amazed" (Monterrosa, Soto) – 4:15
"Urgency" (Monterrosa, Romay) – 3:37
"My Affection" (Monterrosa) – 3:28
"See You Again Soon" (Cabrera, J.C. Monterrosa, Bill Withers) – 3:32
"Cumbia Raza" – 3:34
"America, Mi Radio" – 3:43

Personnel
deSoL
Albie Monterrosa - acoustic guitar, vocals
Andy Letke - piano, organ, vocals
Jamz Guerreo - percussion, vocals
Chris Guice - bass guitar, vocals, trumpet

Additional personnel:
Armando Cabrera - percussion
Soto - Lead guitar, vocals
Ron Shields - drums
"TOP" Tim Perry - drums
George Saccal - drums
Franke Previte - backing vocals

Production
Producer: Franke Previte & Michael Lloyd
Engineers: Steve Greenwell, Bob Kearney, James Delatacoma
Production Coordination: Benita Brazier
Art: Amy Johnson
Photography: Danny Sanchez Photographer
Accounting: Paul Fried

Charts

References 

DeSoL albums
2005 albums